Delhi Transport Corporation (DTC) is the main public transport operator of Delhi. It is the largest CNG-powered bus service operator in the world.

History

The Delhi Transport Corporation was incorporated in May 1948 by the Indian government for local bus services when they found out the incumbent service provider Gwalior and Northern India Transport Company Ltd. was inadequate in serving the purpose. It was then named "Delhi Transport Service". It was again constituted as "Delhi Road Transport Authority" under the Road Transport Corporation Act, 1950. This Authority became an undertaking of Municipal Corporation of Delhi by an Act of Parliament in April, 1958. In 1971, on a recommendation from the Indian government took over the assets and liabilities from the erstwhile Delhi Transport Undertaking (DTU) operated by the Municipal Corporation of Delhi until 2 November 1971. Delhi Transport Corporation which was under administrative control of the Indian government was transferred to the Government of National Capital Territory, Delhi. Beginning in October 2019, New Delhi began rolling out free bus transit for women on the Delhi Transport Corporation, with women traveling for free when using pink tickets.

Routes

Delhi Transport Corporation operates on many routes in Delhi and neighbouring States. The mofussil buses operate around 46 depots out of which 18 depots are of old DTC buses and rest have low floor buses while the inter-state buses operate from the Three Inter State Bus Terminals in Kashmiri Gate, Sarai Kale Khan and Anand Vihar.

Intra-Delhi bus services

Delhi Transport Corporation services in Delhi has vastly distributed network of bus services. It connects almost every part of Delhi with this network of buses. The most Prominent of these being the Mudrika and the Bahri Mudrika Seva services interconnecting all parts of the city with a great frequency of buses until approximately 22:30.

High capacity bus service

Delhi Transport Corporation has started High Capacity Bus Service on a few routes and work is in progress to develop more high capacity bus routes. This service uses buses with improved carrying capacity and better facilities like air-conditioning, less travel time, less congestion, more comfortable interiors, GPS navigation etc. And now in the list of High Capacity Buses is the new, sleek, red coloured air-conditioned buses of the Delhi Transport Corporation, which was inaugurated by Chief Minister Sheila Dikshit on 4 June 2008 during the celebrations of World Environment Day in the Capital at India Gate. Chief Minister Sheila Dikshit flagged off the eight new air-conditioned Red Line buses, which will initially ply on select routes in the capital, of which two will be on the newly constructed bus rapid transport corridor. The minimum bus fare starts at ₹5 and the maximum is ₹25 (excluding passes, which are of ₹50-55 ).

Fleet

It is having a fleet of 3757 buses, apart from this there are 3383 cluster buses, taking total fleet to 7140 buses. The green non-ac and the red non-ac DTC vehicles are low floor buses while the orange ones are a mix of high floor and low floor. In the high floor buses, the 2nd door is located behind the rear axles whereas in the low floor vehicles the 2nd door is located in the centre. The fleet comprises semi-integral Tata Marcopolo low floor and high floor Starbuses bodied on LPO 1623 Low Floor chassis and on LPO 1613 high floor chassis as well as Ashok Leyland 12M FESLF (Front Engined Semi Low Floor) and RELF (Rear Engined Low Floor) integral buses. Most of the low floor buses use automatic transmission gearboxes. In 2011, DTC had planned to make use of Biogas generated from sewage treatment plants with a total of 120 vehicles running on compressed Renewable natural gas fuel. The Delhi cabinet floated a tender to add 1000 electric buses to the fleet with charging stations every 3 kilometres.

In 2021, the DTC made its final order of combustion-powered buses. It made an order for 800 CNG buses, with the intention that these be the last combustion buses purchased by the Delhi government. After that, all new bus purchases will be electric buses, according to Delhi Cabinet minister Kailash Gahlot.

Delhi Integrated Multi-Modal Transit System (DIMTS)

Delhi Integrated Multi-Modal Transit System (DIMTS) Limited is transport consultancy and infrastructure development company. It is a joint venture company with equal equity of the Government of National Capital Territory of Delhi (GNCTD) and the IDFC Foundation (a not-for-profit initiative of Infrastructure Development Finance Company Limited).

The buses of DIMTS are orange (Non AC) and blue (AC). it has a fleet of 1725 buses deployed under the cluster scheme have state-of-the-art technology to guide and monitor them. They have been equipped with Global Positioning System (GPS) devices so that their movement and geographic location are tracked by the Automatic Vehicle Location (AVL) system on real-time basis that provides ETA and other data to the passengers by PoochhO App, the App also has trip planner, pollution status in vicinity and other features. Electronic Ticketing Machines (ETM) are being used on these buses in place of pre-printed tickets as part of the automated fare collection (AFC) system, since August 2018 it is possible to use DMRC Metro Card to buy tickets in DIMTS' buses. Under the scheme the private concessionaires, who would be allotted clusters, would bring in their buses, arrange for their cleaning and maintenance and provide for the staff. For the services rendered, the concessionaire would be paid on the basis of an indexed cost system that would have a fixed component based on the cost of the bus, a variable component that would factor in the fuel and maintenance costs and a component that would deal with the wages cost keeping in mind the consumer price index.

Inter-state bus services

DTC was one of the premier bus services of North India. Which connects almost all the major centres of North India with its services. At present Interstate bus service is suspended. It covers only few area of NCR.

See also
Delhi Metro
Transport in Delhi
National Capital Region Transport Corporation

References

External links

 Delhi Transport Corporation Website

Transport in Delhi
Companies based in New Delhi
Metropolitan transport agencies of India
State agencies of India
Bus companies of India
State road transport corporations of India
Transport companies established in 1948
Indian companies established in 1948